Maha Rat is a district (amphoe) in the northern part of Ayutthaya province in Thailand.

History
Originally the district was named Khwaeng Nakhon Yai. It was converted to an amphoe in 1914 and changed its name to Maha Rat in 1917.

Geography
Neighboring districts are (from the north clockwise) Ban Phraek of Ayutthaya Province, Don Phut of Saraburi province, Bang Pahan of Ayutthaya Province, and Pa Mok, Mueang Ang Thong, and Chaiyo of Ang Thong province.

Administration
The district is divided into 12 sub-districts tambon, which are further subdivided into 58 villages muban.  There are two sub-district municipalities (thesaban tambon). Maha Rat covers the whole tambon Hua Phai and Maha Rat. Rong Chang covers the whole tambon Nam Tao, Rong Chang, Chao Pluk, and Phit Phian. There are a further five tambon administrative organizations.

References

External links
amphoe.com (Thai)

Maha Rat